Seaborne targets are vessels or floating structures that are shot at for practice by naval or air forces. They may be remotely controlled and mobile, or towed behind other craft, or just set adrift in the sea.

Target ships

Target ships are vessels, typically obsolete or captured warships, used for naval gunnery practice or for weapons testing – perhaps most spectacularly in Operation Crossroads (1946), where 95 ships were sunk in a U.S. nuclear weapons test at Bikini Atoll.

Powered targets

In the U.S. Navy, a Seaborne Powered Target (SEPTAR) is an unmanned surface vehicle used as the naval counterpart of a target drone. They are remote-controlled, and all but the smallest can be equipped with electromagnetic emitters to appear as a larger ship on sensors. 

As of 2013, U.S. Navy SEPTARs include:
Hammerhead usv-t: A high-speed drone capable of multiple vessel attacks.
Turkish Navy variants,

 Aselsan ALBATROS-T High-Speed Unmanned Surface Target Boat
 Aselsan ALBATROS-K  High-Speed Unmanned Surface Target Boat

Towed targets

Targets can also be towed behind other craft, the counterparts of target tugs in aviation. 

The U.S. Navy employs the Low-Cost Modular Target (LCMT), a modular barge made from pontoons, scaffolding and large colored sails as visual targets, which can be shot at with guns or a variety of missiles. It is usually towed by a HSMST.

Free-floating targets

Navies have used all sort of equipment thrown overboard for gunnery practice, such as empty barrels. 

Modern free-floating targets are large, inflatable and bright orange; hence the nickname "killer tomato".

References

Naval education and training
Targeting (warfare)